North Star is the seventh studio album by Curved Air and was released on 17 March 2014. It was the first studio album of mostly new material since the band reformed in 2008, following 2008's Reborn (mostly re-recordings of material from their first five albums, with two new tracks), 2010's Retrospective (a "best-of" anthology of original recordings from 1970–1976 plus three tracks by MASK) and 2012's Live Atmosphere (live performances from 2010/11).

Background and recording
Although guitarist Kit Morgan is credited as co-writer of the seven new songs, by the time of recording he had left the band and his place was taken by the returning Kirby Gregory.

Three songs that originally appeared on the first two Curved Air albums were re-recorded, plus one from a Sonja Kristina solo album, and three covers of songs originated by other bands.

Track listing
All tracks written by Harris/Kristina/Morgan/Norton/Pilkington-Miksa/Sax unless otherwise noted

"Stay Human" – 
"Time Games" – 
"Puppets" (Darryl Way, Sonja Kristina) –  
 first appeared on Second Album
"Images and Signs" – 
"Interplay" – 
"Spider" – 
"Magnetism" – 
"Colder Than A Rose In Snow" (Paul Travis, Norma Tager) – 
first appeared on the 1980 Sonja Kristina album
"Spirits in the Material World" (Sting) – 
"Old Town News" – 
"Situations" (Darryl Way, Rob Martin) – 
first appeared on Air Conditioning
"Chasing Cars" (Gary Lightbody, Nathan Connolly, Jonny Quinn, Tom Simpson, Paul Wilson) – 
cover of song by Snow Patrol 
"Young Mother" (Darryl Way, Sonja Kristina) – 
first appeared on Second Album
"Across the Universe" (John Lennon, Paul McCartney) –

Personnel
Curved Air
 Sonja Kristina – vocals
 Florian Pilkington-Miksa – drums
 Kirby Gregory – guitar
 Chris Harris – bass guitar and electric upright bass
 Robert Norton – keyboards
 Paul Sax – violin

Production credits
 Marvin Ayres – advisor, engineer, vocal engineer
 Beric Wickens - Producer
 Denis Blackham – mastering
 Nuno Fernandes – engineer
 Carl Glover – graphic design, montage, photography
 Michael Inns – portraits
 Chris Smith – engineer
 Ben Williams – engineer

References

Curved Air albums
2014 albums